The Eliica (or the Electric Lithium-Ion Car) is a battery electric vehicle prototype or concept car first shown in 2004 and designed by a team at Keio University in Tokyo, led by Professor Hiroshi Shimizu. The  car runs on a lithium-ion battery and can accelerate from 0– in four seconds (faster than the Porsche 911 Turbo at the time). The team's goal is to exceed , breaking the record set by today's street-legal gasoline-powered vehicles.

Shimizu's new project is called "SIM-Drive" (シムドライブ), with wheel hub motors.

KAZ 

The Eliica is a refinement of the earlier KAZ (Keio Advanced Zero-emission vehicle), a  limousine-sized 8-wheel 8-person electric vehicle prototype of 2003 that also set speed records.

Design details 

The Eliica weighs  and seats the driver and three passengers. The body was tested in a wind tunnel. The front doors open forward and the rear doors open upward like gull wings. The car's platform contains 4 tracks of 80 batteries, which make up one third of the vehicle's cost. They currently require about 10 hours of recharging at 100 volts from empty to full charge, and can be easily charged off a residential power grid.

The car has eight wheels to improve traction, and they are smaller than normal passenger vehicles, so it can be lower to the ground for better aerodynamics and stability. Each of the wheels has a  electric motor, giving a  eight wheel drive which can tackle all kinds of road surfaces. The four front wheels steer. The electric motors mean that the Eliica can deliver a smooth acceleration free from gear shifts of about 0.8 g. Each wheel contains a disc brake and employs a regenerative brake system to recover energy.

There are currently (as of 2005) two versions of the Eliica: a Speed model and an Acceleration model.

Once the team receives corporate sponsorship, they plan to produce at least 200 units.

On December 19, 2005, then-Prime Minister of Japan Junichiro Koizumi tested this vehicle in a 10-minute ride to the Japanese Parliament. In 2006, the car was tested by Shintaro Ishihara, the governor of Tokyo, as well as by  Naruhito, Crown Prince of Japan.

See also 
 Electric vehicle
 Battery electric vehicle
 List of electric cars currently available
 Eight-wheel drive
 Toyota FCHV
 Honda EV Plus

Land speed record electric vehicles
 La Jamais Contente
 Buckeye Bullet

Other 8-wheelers
 OctoAuto
 1925 8-wheel car Liborio E. Rivas of Santa Rita, New Mexico patented it in April 1925
  "Spider-Car" an experimental vehicle, produced by Eight Wheel Motor Vehicle Company, appeared in 1929 in San Francisco; rebuild 1927 Marmon 
Limousine
 I.D.E.A KAZ 2001 luxury limousine concept; Each of the KAZ’s 8 wheels is powered by its own electric motor, 6 of which are involved in steering.
DIY
 8-wheeled 1977 Cadillac Eldorado (chassis number 6L47S7Q306322) built from 1980s-1999, V8 engine, four front wheels are for steering 
 8-wheeled Corvette finished in 2010
8 Wheel 1989 Isuzu Pickup - Triple Play  built from 2005-08 by Steve Francis of Montgomery, Texas; V8 engine, zero ground clearance  there is also a 10 Wheel 1991 Isuzu Pickup from 2005

References

External links

 

Concept cars
Electric land speed record cars
Electric concept cars
Automobiles with gull-wing doors
Vehicles with wheel motors
Eight-wheeled vehicles